Choeromorpha polynesus is a species of beetle in the family Cerambycidae. It was described by White in 1856, originally under the genus Agelasta. It is known from Borneo, Malaysia and Indonesia.

References

Choeromorpha
Beetles described in 1856